Juan Taverna (13 April 1948 – 7 November 2014) was an Argentine former footballer.

References

1948 births
2014 deaths
Association football forwards
Argentine footballers
Estudiantes de La Plata footballers
Real Murcia players
Boca Juniors footballers
La Liga players
Doping cases in association football